The MV Dumana was a British passenger and cargo ship that was sunk during the Second World War.

Pre-war career
Dumana was built by Barclay Curle at Whiteinch, Glasgow as the Melma, and launched on 21 November 1921. She was completed by 16 March 1923 and entered service under her new name Dumana for the British India Steam Navigation Company, who registered her in Glasgow. Dumana initially ran between London, Karachi and Bombay, and then in 1934 was transferred to work the route to Calcutta.

Second World War
The UK Air Ministry chartered Dumana in 1939 for the Mediterranean Air Command to use as a base ship, and she was fitted with workshops to overhaul aircraft. On 5 May 1939, in London, the headquarters of the No. 86 (General Reconnaissance) Wing RAF was reformed aboard Dumana. On 10 May 1939 she sailed from London for Malta carrying Fleet Air Arm units; 19 May 1939 arrived at Grand Harbor, Malta and disembarked FAA units. On 2 June 1939 arrived at Alexandria, Egypt. On 10 October 1939, the headquarters of the No. 86 (General Reconnaissance) Wing RAF disembarked at Aboukir, Egypt. On 12 October 1939, the headquarters of the No. 86 (General Reconnaissance) Wing RAF re-embarked with 802 Naval Air Squadron. On 2 December 1939, the MV Dumana arrived at Marsaxlokk, Malta, disembarking 802 Naval Air Squadron. Arrived Grand Harbor, Malta on 4 December 1939. Departed on 14 December 1939 for Gibraltar.

In 1941 Dumana evacuated RAF personnel from Crete after Germany invaded the island. In 1942 she was converted into a base ship for flying boats, and sailed to Bathurst with two squadrons of Short Sunderlands.

Sinking
Dumana, commanded by her Master, Archibald Richard George Drummond, made her final voyage with convoy STL 8, traveling from Port Etienne to Takoradi via Freetown, carrying 300 tons of RAF stores. She called at Freetown on 23 December, and by evening of 24 December was west of Sassandra Cote d'Ivoire. She was spotted by Werner Henke's  and torpedoed at 2030 hours. Two of three torpedoes struck and she sank in five minutes, preventing several of her lifeboats from being launched.

Three officers, seven crew members, 20 lascars, two DEMS gunners and seven RAF personnel went down with her, with the master, 107 crew members, seven gunners and 15 RAF personnel surviving to be rescued by the naval trawlers Arran and Southern Pride. The survivors were taken to Takoradi, arriving on 25 December. Six unidentified bodies were washed up on the beach in Sassandra and are buried in Commonwealth War Grave Commission plot in the Municipal Cemetery of Sassandra, marked by a standard CWGC Merchant Navy headstone. A memorial stone was erected by the Free French in Sassandra in Côte d'Ivoire a year after the sinking, and dedidacted by Governor Latrille on 29 December 1944.

References

Sources

1921 ships
Ships built on the River Clyde
World War II merchant ships of the United Kingdom
Ships of the British India Steam Navigation Company
World War II shipwrecks in the Atlantic Ocean
Maritime incidents in December 1943
Ships sunk by German submarines in World War II
Ships of the Royal Air Force